The Anglican Church of Canada, a member church of the worldwide Anglican Communion, contains thirty-two jurisdictions, consisting of twenty-nine dioceses, one administrative region with diocesan status, one ordinariate (for  military chaplaincy), and one national pastoral jurisdiction (for indigenous people). The 29 dioceses and the special administrative area are organised into four ecclesiastical provinces.

Most dioceses are contained within a single civil province or territory. The four exceptions are the Arctic, Moosonee, Nova Scotia and Prince Edward Island, and Ottawa dioceses.

Each diocese has a bishop, four of whom are archbishops as metropolitans of their ecclesiastical province. Dioceses are self-governing entities, incorporated under the Corporations Act of the civil province or territory in which they are active.

Diocesan synods generally meet annually and have responsibility for those aspects of church life which do not concern doctrine, discipline, or worship.  These latter matters are the purview of the General Synod of the national church, which meets triennially and at other times delegates its powers to an elected body of clergy and laity, called the Council of General Synod, and to the Primate of the Anglican Church of Canada.

Provinces
The Anglican Church of Canada is divided into four ecclesiastical provinces, each under the jurisdiction of a provincial synod and a metropolitan archbishop. Originally the metropolitans were bishops of particular dioceses within the provinces. In 1893 the metropolitans were granted the title of "archbishop", and they are now elected from among the bishops of each province.

The Ecclesiastical Province of Canada was founded in 1860, originally consisting of the four dioceses in the then civil Province of Canada (Upper and Lower Canada, i.e. modern Ontario and Quebec, respectively) under the metropolitical authority of the Bishop of Montreal. The province was expanded in 1870 and 1871 to include New Brunswick and Nova Scotia. In 1913, the Ontario dioceses were split off to form the Province of Ontario (see below). The Province was expanded to include the civil province of Newfoundland following its entrance into Confederation in 1949. The province today comprises seven dioceses.
The Ecclesiastical Province of Rupert's Land was formed in 1875, covering the Prairie Provinces and initially under the metropolitical authority of the Bishop of Rupert's Land. Today it comprises ten dioceses.
The Ecclesiastical Province of Ontario was formed out of the Province of Canada and the Diocese of Moosonee (which had been in the Ecclesiastical Province of Rupert's Land) in 1912. Today, it comprises seven dioceses.
The Ecclesiastical Province of British Columbia and Yukon was formed out of the Ecclesiastical Province of Rupert's Land as the Ecclesiastical Province of British Columbia in 1914. It was expanded in 1943 (and consequently renamed) to incorporate the Diocese of Yukon, which was transferred from Rupert's Land. The province today comprises five dioceses and one ecclesiastic territory.

Archbishops
The Primate of Canada (who has no diocese) bears the title Archbishop and is styled The Most Reverend. The current Primate is Linda Nicholls. The Primate is elected from among all the bishops across the country.

The four metropolitans (who all bear the style of The Most Reverend and the title Archbishop) are:
Canada: David Edwards, Archbishop of Fredericton 
Rupert's Land: Greg Kerr-Wilson, Archbishop of Calgary
Ontario: Anne Germond, Archbishop of Algoma and Moosonee 
British Columbia and Yukon: Lynne McNaughton, Archbishop of Kootenay

The National Indigenous Anglican Archbishop has no metropolitical authority, but also bears the style of The Most Reverend and the title Archbishop. The holder of this office (established as a bishopric in 2005, inaugurated in 2007, and raised to the status of an archbishopric in 2019) has the spiritual leadership of indigenous people nationwide. Mark MacDonald, the first holder of the office, resigned in 2022 as a result of sexual misconduct. Nicholls appointed Bishop Sidney Black as interim National Indigenous Bishop. In December of that year, Bishop Chris Harper of Saskatoon was announced as the new archbishop-elect.

Dioceses and bishops

See also

 List of Anglican Communion dioceses
 List of Roman Catholic dioceses in Canada

Notes

External links 

 Dioceses of the Anglican Church of Canada

References

Canada
Anglican Church of Canada, List of dioceses of the
Anglican Church of Canada